Ian Lucas (born 5 November 1967) is a former professional rugby league footballer who played in the 1980s and 1990s, and coached in the 1990s. Ian Lucas won caps for Great Britain while at Wigan in 1991 against France, and in 1992 against Australia.

Playing career
Lucas played left- (replaced by interchange/substitute Denis Betts) in Wigan's 22-17 victory over Salford in the 1988 Lancashire Cup Final during the 1988–89 season at Knowsley Road, St. Helens on Sunday 23 October 1988.

Lucas played left- (replaced by interchange/substitute Shaun Wane on 21-minutes) in Wigan's 24-12 victory over Halifax in the 1989–90 Regal Trophy Final during the 1989–90 season at Headingley, Leeds on Saturday 13 January 1990.

Lucas was an interchange/substitute in Wigan’s 8-2 victory over Manly-Warringah Sea Eagles in the 1987 World Club Challenge at Central Park, Wigan on 7 October 1987. During the 1991–92 Rugby Football League season, he played for defending champions Wigan from the interchange bench in their 1991 World Club Challenge victory against the visiting Penrith Panthers.

He was selected to go on the 1992 Great Britain Lions tour, but was injured during the first Test against Australia in a tackle by Paul Harragon. When the touring party returned to England, he made a limited number of appearances for Wigan in the 1992–93 season, including an appearance as a substitute in the 1992 World Club Challenge against the visiting Brisbane Broncos, but was forced to retire at the end of the season due to a neck injury.

References

External links
Statistics at wigan.rlfans.com

1967 births
Living people
Rugby league props
Wigan Warriors players
Great Britain national rugby league team players
Leigh Leopards coaches
Place of birth missing (living people)